Laobambos is a genus of bamboo in the family Poaceae. It has only one species, Laobambos calcareus, native to Laos. It is unique among the bamboos in that it has succulent culms, an adaptation to seasonal drought in its karstic habitat.

References

Bamboo
Bambusoideae
Bambusoideae genera
Succulent plants
Endemic flora of Laos
Plants described in 2020
Monotypic Poaceae genera